Tabula rasa ("blank slate") is a philosophical concept.

Tabula Rasa may also refer to:

Television
 "Tabula Rasa", an episode of Buffy the Vampire Slayer
 "Tabula Rasa", an episode of Heroes
 "Tabula Rasa", an episode of Lost
 "Tabula Rasa", an episode of Stargate Atlantis
 "Tabula Rasa", an episode of Criminal Minds
 "Tabula Rasa", an episode of Justice League
 "Tabula Rasa", an episode of Law & Order
 Tabula Rasa, a 2017 Dutch series

Music
 Tabula Rasā, a collaborative album featuring Béla Fleck, Vishwa Mohan Bhatt, and Jie-Bing Chen
 Tabula Rasa (Bloodbound album)
 Tabula Rasa (Brymo album)
 Tabula Rasa (Einstürzende Neubauten album)
 Tabula Rasa (Arvo Pärt), piece for Two Violins, string orchestra and prepared piano.
 Tabula Rasa (Finnish band), a Finnish rock group
 Tabula Rasa (Pittsburgh band), an American post-hardcore math-rock band
 "Tabula Rasa", a song by Covenant on the 1996 album Sequencer
 "Tabula Rasa", a 1998 song by Freundeskreis
 "Tabula Rasa", a song by Sinch on their 2002 album Sinch
 "Tabula Rasa", a song by Björk on the 2017 album Utopia
 III: Tabula Rasa or Death and the Seven Pillars, a 2013 album by The Devil's Blood
 "Tabula Rasa", a song by Earl Sweatshirt on the 2021 album Sick!

Literature
 Tabula Rasa, a 2010 novel by Nathan Shaham

Gaming
 Tabula Rasa (video game)
 An area in the video game Star Trek: New Worlds

See also
 Blank pad rule, a legal rule
 Blank slate (disambiguation)
 Carte blanche (disambiguation)